Eastern Outer Islands was a single-member constituency of the Legislative Council, Governing Council and Legislative Assembly of the Solomon Islands between 1967 and 1976. It was succeeded by the First and Second Eastern Outer Islands constituencies, with the constituency's final MP, Moffat Bonunga, re-elected in the First constituency.

List of MPs

Election results

1973

1970

1967
The 1967 elections were carried out using an electoral college.

References

Legislative Council of the Solomon Islands constituencies
Governing Council of the Solomon Islands constituencies
Legislative Assembly of the Solomon Islands constituencies
1967 establishments in the Solomon Islands
Constituencies established in 1967
1976 disestablishments in the Solomon Islands
Constituencies disestablished in 1976